The Toyota Takaoka Assembly Plant, also known as Takaoka Plant, was built in Toyota City, Aichi, Japan in 1966 to build the first Toyota Corolla (series KE10). Production officially began January 1967 where production was transferred from the Toyota Motomachi plant.

The location continues to build the Corolla, and was the manufacturing location for past and current models that included the Toyota Publica, Toyota Sprinter, Toyota Carina, Toyota Tercel, Toyota Cynos and the Toyota Prius. This number of employees is from December 2011, and excludes fixed-term employees and short-term employees.

It also serves as a support location for various Toyota assembly locations internationally.

External links 
 

Companies based in Aichi Prefecture
Toyota factories
1960 establishments in Japan